¡Mira quién baila!, also known as ¡Más que baile!, was a Spanish reality television show, and part of the Dancing with the Stars franchise, in which a group of celebrities competed in a dancing contest of several styles over several weeks, partnered with dance professionals. The prize that the winner obtained was given to charitable organisations of their choice.

History
The program premiered on La 1 of Televisión Española as ¡Mira quién baila! on 13 June 2005. It was presented by Anne Igartiburu and produced by Gestmusic for seven seasons.

TVE gave up the rights to air the show in 2009 due to financial problems, so in 2010 the show moved to Telecinco, where it premiered as ¡Mira quién baila! but was later renamed ¡Más que baile! due to copyright issues; the new name gave the possibility of using the same acronym ¡MQB!. This season was presented by Pilar Rubio.

Televisión Española reacquired the format in 2014 retaining its earlier title, ¡Mira quién baila! and the season was presented by Jaime Cantizano.

In 2018, Televisión Española announced a new adaptation of the original format with a different title, Bailando con las estrellas. This adaptation was intended to adopt the rules of the American adaptation, with each celebrity paired with a professional dance partner throughout the series, unlike in ¡Mira quién baila! where celebrities had a different partner each episode, and weekly eliminations. The show was co-produced by Gestmusic Endemol, like ¡Mira quién baila!.

Winners
  (Season 1)
 David Civera (S2); 61% 
 Rosa López (S3); 62% 
 Estela Giménez (S4); 53%
  (S5)
  (S6); 50.5%
 Manuel Bandera (S7)
 Belén Esteban (S8); 53%
  (S9); 51%

References

Television shows set in Spain
Spanish reality television series
Spanish music television series
RTVE shows
Telecinco original programming
2005 Spanish television series debuts
2014 Spanish television series endings
Dance competition television shows
Spanish television series based on British television series

da:Vild med dans
de:Let’s Dance
hr:Ples sa zvijezdama
it:Ballando con le stelle
no:Strictly Come Dancing
pl:Strictly Come Dancing
pt:Dança Comigo
sv:Let's Dance